John Murray Archibald (19 March 1917 – 9 January 2006) was a Scottish professional footballer, who played as a forward. He made one appearance in the English Football League for Wrexham in the 1946–47 season.

References

1917 births
2006 deaths
Scottish footballers
Association football forwards
Bangor City F.C. players
Wrexham A.F.C. players
English Football League players